Gras double is a tripe dish from the Lyonnaise cuisine of France.

References

French cuisine
Cuisine of Lyon